Aleksandr Mikhailovich Familtsev (born 3 August 1975) is a Kazakhstani football coach and a former player. He also has Russian citizenship.

Familtsev made 34 appearances for the Kazakhstan national football team, scoring one goal.

References

External links
 
 

1975 births
People from Pavlodar
Living people
Kazakhstani footballers
Kazakhstan international footballers
FC Irtysh Pavlodar players
FC Kyzylzhar players
FC Torpedo Moscow players
FC Tom Tomsk players
FC Tobol players
FC Aktobe players
Kazakhstani expatriate footballers
Kazakhstani people of Russian descent
Expatriate footballers in Russia
Russian Premier League players
Kazakhstan Premier League players
FC Sakhalin Yuzhno-Sakhalinsk players
Association football defenders
FC Lokomotiv Nizhny Novgorod players
Kazakhstani football managers